James Mansfield Baker (April 19, 1845 – November 9, 1927) was an American politician who served in the Virginia House of Delegates, representing Louisa County.

References

External links 

1845 births
1927 deaths
Democratic Party members of the Virginia House of Delegates
20th-century American politicians
People from Louisa, Virginia